Nuria Bucher (born 21 March 2005) is a Swiss female handballer for Spono Eagles in the Spar Premium League and the Swiss national team.

She made her official debut on the Swiss national team on 3 March 2022, against Lithuania. She represented Switzerland for the first time at the 2022 European Women's Handball Championship in Slovenia, Montenegro and North Macedonia.

References

External links

2005 births
Living people
Swiss female handball players
People from Aarau
21st-century Swiss women